Yanis Merdji (born 29 October 1993) is a French professional footballer who plays as a forward for Ligue 2 club Chamois Niortais. He has previously represented Andrézieux, Bourg-Péronnas, Auxerre, Le Mans and Châteauroux.

Personal life
Merdji is of Algerian descent.

Career statistics

References

External links

1993 births
Living people
Sportspeople from Roanne
Association football forwards
French footballers
Andrézieux-Bouthéon FC players
Football Bourg-en-Bresse Péronnas 01 players
AJ Auxerre players
Le Mans FC players
LB Châteauroux players
Ligue 2 players
French sportspeople of Algerian descent
Footballers from Auvergne-Rhône-Alpes